The Sydney Bears (formally Macquarie Bears) is an Australian semi-professional ice hockey team from Sydney, New South Wales. Established in 1982, the Bears are the only remaining founding member of the Australian Ice Hockey League (AIHL) still operating. The Bears are based at Macquarie Ice Rink, within the Macquarie Centre, in the northern suburbs of Sydney. The Sydney Bears have claimed three Goodall Cups in 2002, 2003 and 2019.

History

Prior to AIHL

The Sydney Bears was founded on 1 July 1982 as the Macquarie Bears Ice Hockey Club Incorporated. The team was formed concurrently to the non-incorporated local ice hockey club sharing the same name. The Bears were based out of the Macquarie Ice Rink. The club competed in the NSW Super League (NSWSL) and then the East Coast Super League (ECSL). In 1989 the Bears claimed the NSWSL championship with star defenceman Glen Foll claiming top points scorer for the season. In 1997 the club decided to change its name to the Sydney Bears Ice Hockey Club in preparation for a new national competition. In September 1999, the Bears won the East Coast Super League after defeating the Canberra Knights in a two match grand final series held at Phillip Ice Skating Centre, Canberra. In game one, on 18 September, the Bears fought their way to a close a 6–5 victory over the hosts. In game two, on 19 September, Sydney's goalkeeper Alan Becken claimed a shutout as the Bears won 5–0.

AIHL era

2000–10

In 2000, the Australian Ice Hockey league (AIHL) was established. The league adopted a franchise arrangement for competing teams so the Sydney Bears set up their incorporation as The Bears AIHL Inc. and were granted an AIHL licence.

The Sydney Bears claimed the inaugural AIHL season premiership by finishing top of the round-robin season involving the Bears, Adelaide Avalanche and Canberra Knights. The Bears were defeated by the Avalanche, 6–5 in a shootout in the single match championship final.

The Sydney Bears backed up this performance and made the championship final in 2001. They were again defeated by the Adelaide Avalanche, 10–7. The Bears did find success in the Goodall Cup tournament in 2001. Held in Newcastle, it was the last Goodall Cup tournament held independently to the AIHL.

In 2002, the Bear's had a breakout AIHL season. The team left Macquarie and moved to the new Sydney Ice Arena in Baulkham Hills. The league doubled in size to six teams and the Bears finished the season first in the table to claim their second premiership. They faced a familiar foe, Adelaide Avalanche, in the first Goodall Cup Final for the AIHL. In Blacktown Ice Arena, the Bears defeated Adelaide 5–4 in a shootout to clinch the Goodall Cup and claim their first AIHL Championship.

In 2003, the AIHL adopted a new finals format that involved the top four teams from the regular season. The Sydney Bears were involved in and won the one and only third place play-off in an AIHL finals weekend. The Bears continued their rivalry with Adelaide and defeated them 10–5 in the match to claim third. From 2004 the AIHL tweaked the finals format to remove this match.

The Bears next found success in 2007 and 2008. In 2007, the Sydney Bears changed their name to the AIHL Bears (or simply the Bears) as the team left Sydney for Penrith. The team played out of the Penrith Ice Palace. The Bears won their second championship and Goodall Cup by defeating the Newcastle North Stars 3–2 in overtime in the final. The Bears also won the inaugural Wilson Cup in 2007. In 2008, the Bears claimed the H Newman Reid Trophy for the first time by finishing top of the league table ahead of the Western Sydney Ice Dogs. The Bears also claimed back-to-back Wilson Cup's after defeating the Ice Dogs in the pre-season tournament's final 6–4.

2010–20

To start the new decade, in 2010, the team rebranded and renamed back to the Sydney Bears. The team switched between Penrith and Sydney ice Arena over the course of seven seasons. In 2017, Macquarie Ice rink, at a cost of $3 million, had been upgraded to AIHL standards providing the Bears the opportunity to return to their spiritual home. The Bears, along with the Ice Dogs, moved into the newly renovated arena located within the Macquarie Centre. The upgrade of Macquarie Ice Rink also brought back the Sydney Bears (IHNSW) club to Macquarie. Since the move in 2017, the AIHL team and the IHNSW club have increased cooperation and support between the two clubs. Ex AIHL Bear's players have been taking up coaching roles within the IHNSW club while the IHNSW Bears provides the AIHL team a pathway for local players. In 2018, prior to the season starting, the Bears unveiled a new team logo to signify their return home to Macquarie.

On the ice, the Bears struggled to find form. The team spent seven consecutive seasons failing to reach the AIHL finals weekend between 2011 and 2017. In 2018 the team's fortunes began to improve. The Bears finished second in the league and made their first appearance in the Goodall Cup final in eleven years. They were defeated 4–3 in overtime by the CBR Brave but their display and spirit was praised. In 2019, the Sydney Bears surprised many and went one better and clinched their third Goodall Cup. It was their second Cup success after finishing the regular season in fourth place. The Bears defeated the Perth Thunder, 5–2 in the final.

Season-by-season results

Notes:

Notes References:

Championships

Goodall Cup 
 Champions (3): 2002, 2007, 2019
 Runners-Up (1): 2001

H Newman Reid Trophy (2008–Current)
 Premiers (1): 2008
 Runners-Up (1): 2018

Wilson Cup
 Winners (6): 2007, 2008, 2016, 2017, 2019, 2022
 Runners-Up (2): 2015, 2018

V.I.P. Cup (2004–07)1
 Premiers (1): 2002
 Runners-Up (1): 2001

East Coast Super League
 Champions (1): 1999

NSW Super League
 Champions (1): 1989

1 This list includes Premierships prior to the first trophy for Premiers in 2004.

Players

Current roster
Team roster for the 2022 AIHL season.

Player records

These are the top-ten all-time player records in franchise history for the following categories: Appearances, Goals, Assists, Points, Penalty minutes
 (Figures are updated after each completed AIHL regular season)

Staff
Current as of 2022 AIHL season.

Team facilities

The Sydney Bears current home venue is the Macquarie Ice Rink, located within the Macquarie Shopping Centre in Macquarie, Sydney. The Macquarie facility consists of an Olympic sized rink (60m x 30m) with seating for approximately 2,000 people.

Macquarie is the spiritual home of the Bears as the team called Macquarie home from foundation in 1982 till 2002. In 2002 the team moved to the recently constructed Sydney Ice Arena in Baulkham Hills, Sydney. After five years the team moved out of Sydney and into the Penrith Ice Palace, Penrith, New South Wales, out west of the city. In 2012 the Bears returned to Sydney and to the Sydney Ice Arena. In late 2013 / early 2014 it was announced that the ownership of the Sydney Ice Arena, Hillsong, had lodged a development application with the NSW Government to re-develop the site into a residential complex, removing the twelve year old ice rink. The Bears moved back to Penrith for the 2015 and 2016 AIHL seasons. In 2017 it was announced that the Bears would return home to Macquarie to play out of the newly upgraded Macquarie Ice Rink, which now met AIHL standards.

Leaders

Team captains
The Bears have had six captains in the team's known history.

References:

Head coaches
The Bears have had three head coaches in the team's known history.

References:

General managers
The Bears have had two general managers/presedents in the team's known history.

References:

Broadcasting
Current:
 Kayo Sports (2022 - present) – Domestic online video broadcasting in Australia as part of the league wide deal struck in the lead up to the 2022 AIHL season to show every AIHL game live.
 Sportradar (2022 - present) – International online video broadcasting in North America and Europe as part of a league-wide 3-year deal signed in March 2022 in the lead up to the 2022 AIHL season.

Former:
 Fox Sports (2013 – 2019) – Part of the entire AIHL domestic TV broadcasting deal with Fox Sports to show one game a round, normally on Thursday's at 4:30 pm or after NHL games during NHL season.
 Self-broadcast (2015 – 2019) – Between 2015 and 2019 the Sydney Bears self-broadcast all home matches with an online audio stream utilising the Mixlr platform. Eric Brook and Nicholas Kutnjak called the play by play with various co commentators joining the team during the season.

References

External links

Sydney Bears Official website
Sydney Bears Official Twitter
AIHL official website
Elite Prospects Team Profile

Australian Ice Hockey League teams
Ice hockey teams in Australia
Sports teams in Sydney
Ice hockey clubs established in 1982
1982 establishments in Australia